Larry Flood (2 March 1912 – 22 January 1999) was an Irish boxer. He competed in the men's welterweight event at the 1932 Summer Olympics.

References

1912 births
1999 deaths
Irish male boxers
Olympic boxers of Ireland
Boxers at the 1932 Summer Olympics
Sportspeople from County Kildare
Welterweight boxers